Giacomo Francesco Zuccarelli (commonly known as Francesco Zuccarelli, ; 15 August 1702 – 30 December 1788) RA, was an Italian artist of the late Baroque or Rococo period.  He is considered to be the most important landscape painter to have emerged from his adopted city of Venice during the mid-eighteenth century, and his Arcadian views became popular throughout Europe and especially in England where he resided for two extended periods.  His patronage extended to the nobility, and he often collaborated with other artists such as Antonio Visentini and Bernardo Bellotto. In 1768, Zuccarelli became a founding member of the Royal Academy of Arts, and upon his final return to Italy, he was elected president of the Venetian Academy. In addition to his rural landscapes which frequently incorporated religious and classical themes, Zuccarelli created devotional pieces and on occasion did portraiture. Beside paintings, his varied output included etchings, drawings, and designs for tapestries as well as a set of Old Testament playing cards.

Despite the fame he experienced in his lifetime, Zuccarelli's reputation declined in the early 19th century with naturalism becoming increasingly favoured in landscapes. Turner criticized him in mild terms while confessing that his figures could be beautiful, paving the way for more severe Victorian assessments. In 1959, the art historian Michael Levey offered suggestions for why Zuccarelli held such wide contemporary appeal among the English, concluding that his best work is highly decorative. More recently, since the 1990s there has been a renewed focus on Zuccarelli among Italian scholars, who have given him prominence in several books and articles, and his paintings and drawings are regularly shown in exhibitions.

Rome and Tuscany (1702–32)

The third-youngest of four sons, Giacomo Francesco Zuccarelli was born at Pitigliano, in southern Tuscany, on 15 August 1702.  His prosperous father Bartolomeo owned several local vineyards, and also in the northwest not far from Pisa, a shop offering kitchen tools and spices. Around the age of eleven or twelve, Zuccarelli began his apprenticeship in Rome with the portrait painters Giovanni Maria Morandi (1622–1717) and his pupil Pietro Nelli (1672–1740), under whose tutelage he learned the elements of design while absorbing the lessons of Roman classicism. Zuccarelli completed his first commission in his hometown of Pitigliano in the years 1725–27, a pair of chapel altarpieces. With the sponsorship of the Florentine art connoisseur, Niccolò Gabburri (1676–1742), from 1728 to 1731 he devoted his energies mostly to etching, eventually producing at least 43 prints, the majority consisting of two series which recorded the deteriorating frescoes of Giovanni da San Giovanni (1592–1636) and Andrea del Sarto (1486–1531). During his five years spent in Florence, though preoccupied with figurative subjects, he began to experiment with drawings in landscape, as shown by works now preserved in the department of prints and drawings at the Uffizi, including a view of the Tuscan capital. According to Luigi Lanzi, writing in the 1790s, the Roman landscape painter and etcher Paolo Anesi (1697–1773) was the key mentor of Zuccarelli in the genre which eventually led to his renown.

Twenty years in Venice (1732–52)

In 1732, after a stay of several months in Bologna, Zuccarelli relocated to Venice.  Prior to his arrival in the Republic, the death of Marco Ricci in 1730 had created an opening in the field of landscape painting amid a marketplace crowded with history painters. While continuing to paint religious and mythological works, he increasingly devoted his attention to landscapes, drawing inspiration from the classicism of Claude and the Roman school. His early paintings from the 1730s show briefly the influence of Alessandro Magnasco, and for a longer period, of Ricci. Zuccarelli brought a more mellow and airy palette to the typically Venetian colors, and using tonal values of higher luminous content than Ricci, the figures in his idyllic landscapes came to life. An almost immediate success in Venice, he enjoyed early patronage, from amongst others, Marshal Schulenburg; Joseph (Consul) Smith, who became his longtime patron; and Francesco Algarotti; who recommended him to the Elector of Saxony, Augustus III of Poland. In 1735, Zuccarelli married Giustina Agata Simonetti in the church of Santa Maria Zobenigo in Venice, and they had four daughters, the first two dying as infants, followed by two sons. He attended the baptism of the daughter of the painter Gaspare Diziani in 1743, and he often worked with other artists, including Bernardo Bellotto and Antonio Visentini. Under the auspices of Consul Smith, during the mid–1740s he produced with Visentini a series featuring neo-Palladian architecture, as can be seen in Burlington House (1746). The most interesting of the Zuccarelli and Visentini collaborations was a set of 52 playing cards with Old Testament subjects published in Venice in 1748.  The hand-coloured scenes are treated in a light manner; the suits are circles, diamonds, hearts, and jars, each containing a mixture of inscribed emblems; and the cards begin with the creation of Adam and end with a battle scene that has an elephant carrying a castle. The outstanding achievement of his first Venetian period was a series of seven canvases, now located at Windsor Castle, which according to a note in an 18th century manuscript catalogue, represent the biblical characters of Rebecca with Jacob and Esau. The tall paintings are delicately painted and dream-like, and most likely were originally situated at Consul Smith's villa at Mogliano Veneto. He also occasionally created pastiches of various 17th-century Dutch masters.

In the years 1748 to 1751, Zuccarelli made frequent trips to Bergamo, invited by his friend Francesco Maria Tassi. Through Tassi, he met Cesare Femi, a student of the portrait painter Fra Galgario, and under his influence he realized three portraits now held at the Accademia Carrara.

Around this time, Zuccarelli's paint handling became more responsive to mood, utilizing bright colours that demonstrate a vibrant quality even though thinly laid on. The artist Richard Wilson painted a portrait of Zuccarelli in 1751 at Venice, and Zuccarelli was influential in redirecting Wilson away from portraits and towards landscape painting. During the following year Zuccarelli discussed the techniques of Italian Renaissance painters with Joshua Reynolds, with Zuccarelli expressing the opinion that Paolo Veronese and Tintoretto painted on gesso grounds, while Titian did not.

First English period (1752–1762)

According to Henry Angelo, it was Richard Dalton, the royal librarian, who persuaded Zuccarelli to travel to England. Consul Smith was also likely involved in some way. A splendid canvas of the artist's early English period, signed and dated 1753, depicts a cheerful country festival. The Arcadian style remains his best known, where nature is transfigured into pleasant scenery, representing a platonic golden age, pervaded with beauty and love.

His decorative talent resulted in diverse work, including the design of tapestries with the weaver Paul Saunders at Holkham Hall. Based on the tapestry cartoons, Zuccarelli was commissioned in 1758 by Thomas Coke, 1st Earl of Leicester to produce the corresponding paintings of Oriental themes, such as Pair with Dromedary.

By November 1757, Zuccarelli had become a member of the Dilettante Society. In 1760, he painted the elegiac Et in Arcadio Ego, a work described as an "admirable picture" by the poet George Keate. In the same year, Zuccarelli borrowed from Shakespeare, depicting a scene from Macbeth where Macbeth and Banquo encounter the three witches, noteworthy as being one of the first paintings to portray theatrical characters in a landscape. The impetus of the work may have come from the portrayals of Macbeth by the actor David Garrick, a later acquaintance. Its initial genesis was a pen and ink sketch, followed by paintings on panel and then canvas.

In this period, he also produced vedute, a genre new to him, seen for example in A View of the River Thames from Richmond Hill looking towards Twickenham, and the View of Vicenza with Ancient Monuments. Zuccarelli held a sale of his canvases in 1762 at Prestage and Hobbs in London, before his departure for Italy. The pictures listed for sale comprise a heterogeneous lot, including religious scenes, a portrait, the Four Seasons, and an Arabian horse Also in 1762, King George III acquired thirty of his works through the purchase of much of Consul Smith's extensive art collection and library in Venice.

Venetian interlude (1762–1764)
Zuccarelli arrived in Venice in September 1762, and he became a member of the Venetian Academy in 1763. There is only one known painting from this interval, the rather academic St. John the Baptist, a composition required by the academy after gaining admittance. Zuccarelli was induced to journey back to London in 1764 by his friend Algarotti's bequest of a cameo and group of drawings made to Lord Chatham.

Second English period (1765–1771)
On this second visit to England, Zuccarelli was lauded by the English nobility and critics alike, and invited to exhibit at leading art societies. He continued to draw from diverse sources, as indicated by a work in a private collection. The peasant woman breast-feeding her child in a landscape shows the influence of Flemish-Dutch artists, Nordic clothing, and hints of Thomas Gainsborough, a favourite referent of Zuccarelli during the 1760s.

The artist contributed works to shows held by the Free Society of Artists in 1765, 1766, and 1782. In 1767, his painting Macbeth and the Witches, probably a third version, was exhibited at The Society of Artists. Shown alongside was the Journey of Jacob. The two paintings had differing compositional styles. While Macbeth had quick and almost unformed brushstrokes, Jacob revealed careful attention to detail. Macbeth later achieved widespread dissemination through a 1770 engraving by William Woollett.

Zuccarelli was a founding member, in 1768, of the Royal Academy of Arts. King George III commissioned the out-sized painting River Landscape with the Finding of Moses (1768), a privilege granted to no other Italian artist. The painting, impeccable from a formal point of view, clearly shows the influences of Gaspard Dughet as well as Claude Lorrain. In 1769, Zucccarelli exhibited at the inaugural exhibition of the Royal Academy, showing two landscapes and figures; in 1770, three landscapes, a St. John Preaching in the Wilderness, and a Holy Family; and finally, in 1771, another Holy Family. As a postscript, the Finding of Moses was shown in 1773, two years after his departure to Italy.

Final years in Italy (1771–88)

Upon his return to Venice in 1771, Zuccarelli was received with affection and pride, and in September of that year, the artistic community appointed him director of the Academy of Fine Arts of Venice, followed by president in the following month. Now entering his eighth decade, he departed from his accustomed Arcadian landscapes and adopted an approach more congenial to the current Venetian taste, neoclassical in outlook, harkening back to his youthful emulation of Ricci. A masterpiece of his late maturity, the unusual Landscape with Bridge, Figures, and a Statue, adheres to the model of Francesco Guardi who reinvented capricci by casting them with pre-romantic moods, while at the same time the composition gently mocks Guardi, by the placement of the statue in the center of the composition.  The painting has many elements common to Zuccarelli, such as a fisherman, waterfall, bridge with animals, traveler, and a peasant, but is done with quick brushstrokes, a technique characteristic of this period, and the atmosphere is one of pathos, recalling his earlier Macbeth and the Witches. Another beautiful canvas, Banquet of a Villa, at which outdoor diners sit at a festive table, is realistic in a manner reminiscent of Pietro Longhi, and the parallel and sloping bands of landscape are typical of those favoured by English topographical artists. This continued desire to look at fresh approaches, even as he grew old, perhaps helps explain why Zuccarelli showed little interest in his role as president of the ossified Venetian Academy, where he was often absent from sessions.  In 1774, without giving notice, and to the consternation of the membership, he departed permanently to Florence.

It is apparent that Zuccarelli kept in contact with Great Britain, for in 1775, he was commissioned for a set of four paintings destined for the Scottish residence of Wedderburn Castle, based on engravings of the ruins of Palmyra, first published by Robert Wood in 1753.  The small Turkish style figures standing amidst the classical ruins are in keeping with other oriental scenes of his late maturity, some of which are similar to paintings done by Giovanni Antonio Guardi for Zuccarelli's early patron Marshal Schulenburg in 1746–1747.  Having been a member of the Florentine Academy of Design since his youth, Zuccarelli was created "Master of Nudes" at the academy in 1777, a more prestigious designation than that of a painter of landscapes, then considered a minor art form, in comparison to the traditional elite status given to figure drawing. Zuccarelli continued teaching at the academy until its reorganization in 1784.

In his will of 1787, Zuccarelli made his "beloved wife" Giustina his sole heir, and one and a half years later, he died in Florence on 30 December 1788.  His lengthy obituary, which appeared in the Gazzetta Toscana, described his personality as "straightforward, humble, grateful, compassionate, generous, uniting these solid virtues in the most courteous tactful manner, with much grace in speaking", and it also took note that since his youth, he possessed a "natural genius" for landscapes.

Reputation and legacy

Zuccarelli was one of the few Venetian painters of his era to win universal acclaim, even from critics who rejected the concept of Arcadia. He was especially popular among the followers of Rousseau. Francesco Maria Tassi (1716–1782), in his Lives of the Painters, Sculptors, and Architects of Bergamo remarks that Zuccarelli paints "landscapes with the most charming figures and thus excels not only artists of modern times but rivals the great geniuses of the past; for no one previously knew how to combine the delights of an harmonious ground with figures gracefully posed and represented in the most natural colours". With the move to more representational modes of depicting landscape in the 19th century, negative criticism began to develop, as described by the art historian Michael Levey in a landmark 1959 article, Francesco Zuccarelli in England: Turner's view was restrained, saying Zuccarelli's work was "meretricious", lacking the charm and grace of Watteau, and yet his figures were "sometimes beautiful". Victorian writers, among them partisans of Richard Wilson, sensitive to the neglect of their favourite while the Italian flourished, used adjectives such as theatrical and insincere. Levey contributed to a reevaluation of the artist by explaining the appeal of Zuccarelli to his contemporaries, drawing a parallel with the affection of the 18th century English for pastoral poetry, since everyone could recognize a pleasing convention when they saw one; in this case, a fairyland where "the skies are forever blue, the trees forever green." The exaltation of the rural life as a retreat from the bustle of urbanity had the sanction of a long and distinguished history; for "Virgil had recommended it, Petrarch had practiced it; Zuccarelli was left to illustrate it"; and in Levey's continuation, "at its best—in comparison to an age he never saw—Zuccarelli's work is highly decorative and still capable of giving pleasure". While sparsely treated in Italy for much of the 19th and early 20th centuries, the painter never fell into disfavour there as in England. The last few decades have seen a resurgence of interest in Zuccarelli by Italian scholars, notably by Federico Dal Forno, who published an artistic biography with sixty paintings in 1994, and Federica Spadotto, who issued a catalogue raisonné in 2007. In a larger cultural context, modern historians have considered him to be a figure of interest with his love of escapism, seen as not untypical of the late Baroque.

During the mid to late 18th century Zuccarelli was widely imitated, and artists influenced by him included Richard Wilson, Giuseppe Zais, Giovanni Battista Cimaroli, and Vittorio Amedeo Cignaroli. Among those who created engravings after his work were Joseph Wagner, Fabio Berardi, Giovanni Volpato, Francesco Bartolozzi, and William Woollett.

The Francesco Zuccarelli Municipal Library and Historical Archives is located in the Fortezza Orsini Cultural Centre, in Pitigliano, Italy, the town of the artist's childhood. Also in the vicinity, the Museum of the Orsini Palace has on permanent exhibit Zuccarelli's earliest commissioned altarpieces.

Identification
His paintings are rarely signed, yet they often contain a gourd water bottle that was held at the waist by rural Italian women, a punning allusion to his surname, zucco being the Italian word for gourd. A defining touch found consistently across the long span of Zuccarelli's career is a serene and vaguely sweet expression on the faces of his rounded figures.

Selected paintings

 Saint Michael the Archangel defeating the Devil; and The Redeemer and the Holy Souls of Purgatory (1725–27) - Oil on canvas, 292 cm x 197 cm, Museo di Palazzo Orsini, Pitigliano 
 Landscape with a Castle; and Landscape with a Bridge (c. 1735) - Oil on canvas, 56 cm x 73 cm, Museum of Fine Arts, Budapest 
 Landscape with River and Shepherds at Rest; and Landscape with Bridge and Knight (c. 1736) - Oil on canvas, 41 cm x 62 cm, Accademia Carrara, Bergamo 
 Landscape with Peasants at a Fountain (c. 1740) - Oil on canvas, 79.4 cm x 120.6 cm, The Metropolitan Museum of Art, New York 
 Landscape with a Sleeping Child and a Woman Milking a Cow (early 1740s) - Oil on panel, 61 cm x 91.4 cm, Holyrood Palace, Edinburgh 
 Landscape with a Wayside Tavern (early 1740s) - Oil on canvas, 82.6 cm x 113 cm, Hampton Court Palace, East Molesey, Surrey 
 Landscape with a Woman fording a Stream on Horseback (c. 1742–43) - Oil on canvas, 36.8 cm x 50.2 cm, Windsor Castle, Windsor 
 Roman Capriccio with Triumphal Arch, the Pyramid of Cestius, St. Peter's Basilica and the Castle of the Holy Angel (with Bernardo Bellotto, 1742–47) - Oil on canvas, 117 cm x 132 cm, Galleria nazionale, Parma 
 Wooded Landscape with the Meeting of Isaac and Rebecca (1743) - Oil on canvas, 230 cm x 448 cm, Windsor Castle, Windsor
 Landscape with Jacob Watering Laban's Flock (1743) - Oil on canvas, 230.5 cm x 138.4 cm, Windsor Castle, Windsor 
 Landscape with a Waterfall and Two Women with a Boy Fishing (1740–45) - Oil on canvas, 133.3 cm x 79.1 cm, Buckingham Palace, City of Westminster 
 Bacchanal (c. 1745) - Oil on canvas, 142 cm x 210 cm, Gallerie dell'Accademia, Venice 
 The Banqueting Hall, Whitehall (with Antonio Visentini, 1746) - Oil on canvas, 84.1 cm x 128.9 cm, Windsor Castle, Windsor 
 Silenus with Nymphs (1747) - Oil on canvas, 107 cm x 142 cm, Sanssouci, Potsdam 
 Saint Jerome Emiliani with Orphans and the Virgin in Glory with Child (1748) - Oil on canvas, 270 cm x 181.5 cm, Pinacoteca Repossi, Chiari 
 Portrait of Ercole Comini at Two Years (1751) - Oil on canvas, 51 cm x 41 cm, Accademia Carrara, Bergamo 
 Pastoral Scene (early 1750s) - Oil on canvas, 60 cm x 88 cm, Hermitage Museum, Saint Petersburg 
 Eastern Couple with Dromedary (c. 1756–58) - Oil on canvas, 180 cm x 130 cm, Palazzo Thiene, Vicenza 
 Refreshment during the Ride (c. 1760) - Oil on canvas, 72 cm x 105 cm, Fitzwilliam Museum, Cambridge 
 Et in Arcadio Ego (1760) - Oil on canvas, 76.2 cm x 90.17 cm, collection Sir James Fergusson, London 
 River Landscape with the Finding of Moses (1768) - Oil on canvas, 227.3 cm x 386 cm, Windsor Castle, Windsor 
 Saint John the Baptist Preaching on the River Jordan (late 1760s) - Oil on canvas, 56 cm x 97 cm, Pinacoteca di Brera, Milan 
 Bull Hunting (early 1770s) - Oil on canvas, 114 cm x 150 cm, Gallerie dell'Accademia, Venice 
 Banquet at a Villa (1770–1775) - Oil on canvas, 80 cm x 163 cm, Fondo Ambiente Italiano, Milan

Selected exhibitions showing his works
 Exhibition of Italian Pictures from the 1600s and 1700s - Milan, 1922
 Exhibition of Italian Art - London, 1930
 Exhibition of Venetian Landscape Painting from the 1700s - Rome, 1940
 Five Centuries of Venetian Painting - Venice, 1945
 Eighteenth Century Venice - London, 1951
 An Exhibition of 18th Century Venice - Detroit, 1953
 From Caravaggio to Tiepolo - Rome, 1954
 Italian Art and Britain - London, 1960
 Landscapes and Vedute - Milan, 1967
 Venice in the 18th Century - Paris, 1971
 George III Collector and Patron - London, 1974
 European Drawings from the Fitzwilliam - New York, 1976–1977
 Portrait of Italy in the Century of Tiepolo - Paris, 1982
 Aspects of Venetian Painting in the 18th Century - Madrid, 1990
 The Glory of Venice - London and Washington, 1994–1995
 The Grand Tour: Landscape and Veduta Paintings, Venice and Rome in the 18th Century - Atlanta, 1996
 From Canaletto to Zuccarelli: Venetian Landscapes of the 1700s - Milan, 2003
 Portrait of the City: The Vicenza Palladio in the Views of Zuccarelli - Vicenza, 2017
 Canaletto and the Art of Venice - Buckingham Palace, 2017

Gallery

Footnotes

Notes

Sources

 

 

.

Further reading

External links

 

"Alcume Notize di Zuccarelli. Some Account of Zuccarelli". (Obituary). In: Mercurio Italico:o sia, Ragguaglio Generale intorno alla Letteratura, Belle Arti, Utili Scoperte, ec. di tutta l'Italia. Couchman & Fry, 1789.
Tassi, Francesco Maria; Vite de'pittori, scultori e architetti Bergamaschi; Locatelli; Bergamo, Italy. 1793. See pp. viii, xii, xiv, xv, 36. Francesco Maria Tassi was a long-time friend of Zuccarelli.  The work was published posthumously.
"Francesco Zuccarelli, R.A." in Anecdotes of painters who have resided or been born in England : with critical remarks on their productions; by Edward Edwards, deceased, late teacher of perspective, and associate, in the Royal Academy; intended as a continuation to The anecdotes of painting by the late Horace Earl of Orford. Edward Edwards. London : printed by Luke Hansard & Sons, for Leigh and Sotheby, W.J. and J. Richardson, R. Faulder, T. Payne, and J. White, 1808.
Lanzi, Luigi Antonio; Storia pittorica della Italia dal risorgimento delle belle arti fin presso al fine del XVIII secolo; Vol 1. Silvestre, Milan. 1823. First edition in 1795–6. See references to 'Zuccherelli' on pages 225, 246–7.
"Francisco Zuccarelli, R.A."  in Nollekens and His Times: Comprehending a Life of That Celebrated Sculptor; and Memoirs of Several Contemporary Artists, from the Time of Roubiliac, Hogarth, and Reynolds, to that of Fuseli, Flaxman, and Blake. John Thomas Smith Keeper of the Prints and Drawings in the British Museum. Edited and annotated by Wilfred Whitten. Vol II. London: Henry Colburn, 1829.

1702 births
1788 deaths
People from Pitigliano
18th-century Italian painters
Italian male painters
Italian landscape painters
Royal Academicians
18th-century Italian male artists